John Joseph Busson (2 November 1910 – 1 February 1989) was an English professional golfer. He played in the 1935 Ryder Cup.

He was a professional at Huddersfield and then at Pannal, Harrogate. In 1934, at the age of 23 he won the News of the World Match Play £1,040 tournament at Walton Heath. He beat Charles Whitcombe 2 up in the final and took the first prize of £300 and a large gold medal.

His older brother, Harry (1907–1993), was also a professional golfer and was a well-known club maker.

Professional wins
this list may be incomplete
1934 Leeds Cup, News of the World Match Play
1935 Malden Invitation Tournament
1938 Leeds Cup

Results in major championships

Note: Busson only played in The Open Championship.

NT = No tournament
CUT = missed the half-way cut
"T" indicates a tie for a place

Team appearances
Ryder Cup (representing Great Britain): 1935
England–Scotland Professional Match (representing England): 1934 (winners), 1935 (winners), 1936 (winners), 1937 (winners)

References

English male golfers
Ryder Cup competitors for Europe
People from Hinckley
Sportspeople from Leicestershire
1910 births
1989 deaths